Steven Taylor is an Australian clinical psychologist and professor in the Department of Psychiatry at the University of British Columbia in Canada. He has conducted research on health anxiety for thirty years. In October 2019, about a month before the beginning of the COVID-19 pandemic, Taylor published the book The Psychology of Pandemics. When Taylor proposed the book to his publisher at the time, they rejected the book, telling him that the subject seemed interesting, but that nobody would want to read the book. He then convinced a different publishing company to publish the book instead.

References

External links
 
Faculty page

Living people
Australian psychologists
Academic staff of the University of British Columbia
University of British Columbia alumni
University of Melbourne alumni
Australian emigrants to Canada
Clinical psychologists
Year of birth missing (living people)